S100 calcium-binding protein A5 (S100A5) is a protein that in humans is encoded by the S100A5 gene.

The protein encoded by this gene is a member of the S100 family of proteins containing 2 EF-hand calcium-binding motifs. S100 proteins are localized in the cytoplasm and/or nucleus of a wide range of cells, and involved in the regulation of a number of cellular processes such as cell cycle progression and differentiation. S100 genes include at least 13 members which are located as a cluster on chromosome 1q21. This protein has a Ca2+ affinity 20- to 100-fold higher than the other S100 proteins studied under identical conditions. This protein also binds Zn2+ and Cu2+, and Cu2+ strongly which impairs the binding of Ca2+. This protein is expressed in very restricted regions of the adult brain.

References

Further reading

S100 proteins